Ukraine competed at the 2000 Summer Olympics in Sydney, Australia. 230 competitors, 139 men and 91 women, took part in 185 events in 23 sports.

Medalists

Gold
 Mykola Milchev — Shooting, Men's Skeet Shooting
 Yana Klochkova — Swimming, Women's 200 m Individual Medley 
 Yana Klochkova — Swimming, Women's 400 m Individual Medley

Silver
 Kateryna Serdyuk, Nataliya Burdeyna, and Olena Sadovnycha — Archery, Women's Team
 Andreas Kotelnik — Boxing, Men's Lightweight
 Serhiy Dotsenko — Boxing, Men's Welterweight
 Serhiy Chernyavsky, Oleksandr Fedenko, Serhiy Matveyev, and Oleksandr Symonenko — Cycling, Men's 4000 m Team Pursuit 
 Oleksandr Beresch, Valeriy Honcharov, Ruslan Myezyentsev, Valeriy Pereshkura, Oleksandr Svitlychyi, and Roman Zozulya — Gymnastics, Men's Team Combined Exercises 
 Oksana Tsyhuleva — Gymnastics, Women's Trampoline Individual 
 Denys Sylantyev — Swimming, Men's 200 m Butterfly 
 Yana Klochkova — Swimming, Women's 800 m Freestyle 
 Davyd Saldadze — Wrestling, Men's Greco-Roman Heavyweight (97 kg)
 Yevhen Buslovych — Wrestling, Men's Freestyle Bantamweight (58 kg)

Bronze
 Roman Schurenko — Athletics, Men's Long Jump 
 Olena Hovorova — Athletics, Women's Triple Jump
 Volodymyr Sydorenko — Boxing, Men's Flyweight
 Serhiy Danylchenko — Boxing, Men's Bantamweight
 Andriy Fedchuk — Boxing, Men's Light Heavyweight
 Iryna Yanovych — Cycling, Women's Sprint 
 Hanna Sorokina and Olena Zhupina — Diving, Women's Synchronised Springboard 
 Oleksandr Beresch — Gymnastics, Men's All-around Individual 
 Ruslan Mashurenko — Judo, Men's Middleweight (90 kg)
 Olena Pakholchik and Ruslana Taran — Sailing, Women's 470 Team Competition

Archery

The silver medal that the Ukrainian women's team won in Sydney was the best result the Ukrainian archery squad had yet posted. 
Men

Women

Athletics

Men
Track & road events

Field events

Combined events – Decathlon

Women
Track & road events

Field events

Combined events – Heptathlon

Badminton

Boxing

Men

Canoeing

Sprint
Men

Women

Qualification Legend: 'R = Qualify to repechage; QS = Qualify to semi-final; QF = Qualify directly to final

Cycling

Road
Men

Women

Track

Men
Pursuit

Points race

Madison

Women
Time trial

Sprint

Mountain biking
Men

Diving

Men

Women

Fencing

Ten fencers, seven men and three women, represented Ukraine in 2000.
Men

Women

Gymnastics

Men
Team

Individual finals

Women
Team

Individual finals

Judo

Men

Women

Modern pentathlon

Rhythmic gymnastics

Women

Rowing

Men

Women

Sailing

Men

Women

Open

M = Medal race; EL = Eliminated – did not advance into the medal race; CAN = Race cancelled

Shooting

Six Ukrainian shooters (four men and two women) qualified to compete in the following events:
Men

Women

Swimming

Men

Women

Synchronized swimming

Women

Table tennis

Women

Tennis

Ukraine nominated two female tennis players to compete in the tournament.
Women

Trampolining

Triathlon

Men

Weightlifting

Men

Women

Wrestling

Men's freestyle

Men's Greco-Roman

Notes

Wallechinsky, David (2004). The Complete Book of the Summer Olympics (Athens 2004 Edition). Toronto, Canada. . 
International Olympic Committee (2001). The Results. Retrieved 12 November 2005.
Sydney Organising Committee for the Olympic Games (2001). Official Report of the XXVII Olympiad Volume 1: Preparing for the Games. Retrieved 20 November 2005.
Sydney Organising Committee for the Olympic Games (2001). Official Report of the XXVII Olympiad Volume 2: Celebrating the Games. Retrieved 20 November 2005.
Sydney Organising Committee for the Olympic Games (2001). The Results. Retrieved 20 November 2005.
International Olympic Committee Web Site

References

Nations at the 2000 Summer Olympics
2000
Summer Olympics